NSFW is the debut studio album by the American musical comedy duo Ninja Sex Party, released on September 29, 2011. It is a collection of all the songs that the duo released as music videos from October 22, 2009 to August 17, 2011, alongside new tracks. The song "Dinosaur Laser Fight" was the only single released from the album, and has a music video partially animated by Arin Hanson, also known as Egoraptor. Every song on the album has a music video except for "Introduction", "Accept My Shaft", and "Outroduction". The album was released on CD in 2015, and charted modestly well in the US.

Track listing

Personnel
Dan Avidan – vocals
Brian Wecht – music, production, spoken vocals (tracks 7 and 12)
Charlie Shaw – drums (track 7)
Arin Hanson – additional vocals (track 4), animation

Charts

Weekly charts

Year-end charts

References

2011 debut albums
Ninja Sex Party albums